The 1946 Los Angeles Dons season was their inaugural season in the new eight-team All-America Football Conference. Led by head coach Dudley DeGroot, the Dons finished 7–5–2, third in the West division, and failed to qualify for the playoffs.

The team's statistical leaders included quarterback Charlie O'Rourke with 1,250 passing yards, John Kimbrough with 473 rushing yards, Dale Gentry with 341 receiving yards, and Joe Aguirre with 55 points scored (31 extra points, four field goals, and two touchdowns).

On September 13, 1946, in the first game in team history, the Dons defeated the Brooklyn Dodgers, 20-14, before a crowd of 18,995 at the Los Angeles Memorial Coliseum. Bud Nygren scored the first points on a touchdown pass from quarterback Charlie O'Rourke. With the ball at the Don's 40-yard line, Nygren caught the ball at the Brooklyn 30-yard line and ran the remaining distance to the end zone.

Season schedule

Division standings

Roster
Players shown in bold started at least one game at the position listed as confirmed by contemporary game coverage from the Los Angeles Times.

References

Los Angeles Dons seasons
Los Angeles Dons
Los Angeles Dons